The inguinal ligament, also known as Poupart's ligament or groin ligament, is a band running from the pubic tubercle to the anterior superior iliac spine. It forms the base of the inguinal canal through which an indirect inguinal hernia may develop.

Structure
The inguinal ligament runs from the anterior superior iliac crest of the ilium to the pubic tubercle of the pubic bone.  It is formed by the external abdominal oblique aponeurosis and is continuous with the fascia lata of the thigh.

There is some dispute over the attachments.

Structures that pass deep to the inguinal ligament include:
Psoas major, iliacus, pectineus
Femoral nerve, artery, and vein
Lateral cutaneous nerve of thigh
Lymphatics

Function
The ligament serves to contain soft tissues as they course anteriorly from the trunk to the lower extremity.  This structure demarcates the superior border of the femoral triangle. It demarcates the inferior border of the inguinal triangle.

The midpoint of the inguinal ligament, halfway between the anterior superior iliac spine and pubic tubercle, is the landmark for the femoral nerve.
The mid-inguinal point, halfway between the anterior superior iliac spine and the pubic symphysis, is the landmark for the femoral artery.
The external iliac arteries pass the inguinal ligament posteriorly and inferiorly.

History
It is also referred to as Poupart's ligament, because François Poupart gave it relevance in relation to hernial repair, calling it "the suspender of the abdomen". It is sometimes termed the Fallopian ligament. Colles' ligament is the reflex ligament and not the inguinal ligament.

Additional images

See also

 Pelvis
 Apollo's belt: surface features associated with the inguinal ligaments

References

External links
  - "Deep muscles of the anterior thigh."
  - "Anterior Abdominal Wall: Osteology and Surface Anatomy "
  - "Anterior Abdominal Wall: The Inguinal Ligament"
 
 
 Diagram at gensurg.co.uk

Ligaments